Ibrahim Hussein may refer to:

Ibrahim Hussein (artist) (1936–2009), Malaysian artist
Ibrahim Hussein (runner) (born 1958), Kenyan long-distance runner
Ibrahim Al Hussein (born 1988), Syrian swimmer